TV Plus is a local television station in Kumanovo, North Macedonia.

Line up
 News (Macedonian: Вести)
 No ill will (Macedonian: Нема Љутиш)
 Shelter of imagination (Macedonian: Засолниште на имагинацијата)

References

External links

Television channels in North Macedonia
Mass media in Kumanovo